The Pig 'n Whistle was an American restaurant and bar located in Hollywood on Hollywood Boulevard.

History

The Pig 'n Whistle was originally a chain of restaurants and candy shops, founded by John Gage in 1908.  He opened his first location in Downtown Los Angeles, next to the now-demolished 1888 City Hall at 224 S. Broadway. Restaurateur Sidney Hoedemaker joined the company in 1927 and led expansion efforts throughout Southern California. Hoedemaker purchased a downtown Los Angeles restaurant called Neve's Melody Lane in 1927 and adopted the name "Melody Lane" for new locations through the 1930s and 40s Hoedemaker left Pig 'n Whistle in 1949 and started a chain of Hody's restaurants aimed at the young families moving into the Post WWII suburbs.
The Hollywood location of the Pig 'n Whistle was first opened in 1927 next to The Egyptian Theatre.  The building housing the new restaurant cost $225,000 and featured "[c]arved oak rafters, imported tiles, artistically wrought grilles and balcony and great panelled fresco paintings from Don Quixote."  It was frequented by such celebrities as Spencer Tracy, Shirley Temple and Howard Hughes.  The original Hollywood location closed down after World War II and its distinctive wooden furniture, decorated with hand-carved whistle-playing pigs, was sold to Miceli's Italian Restaurant, located around the corner at 1646 Las Palmas Avenue, where it remains to the present day.

By the late 1990s the location housed a fast-food pizza restaurant, and all that remained of the original tenant was a bas-relief pig on the front of the building.  In 1999, British restaurant operator Chris Breed remodeled the building, recovering the spectacular original ceiling ornamentation, and re-opened the restaurant.

The restaurant name originates from two Old English words, piggin, a lead mug, and wassail, a wine associated with the Yuletide season.

From mid-March 2020 to April 2021, the COVID-19 pandemic forced the restaurant to serve customers in a take-away format. It soon closed, and in October 2021, the interior was gutted, with the exterior being crudely painted over, as a cantina would take over its space. This included the bas-relief pigs being covered by skulls to establish the new restaurant's theme. No modification permits had been taken out by the building's owner with the city of Los Angeles for either the exterior and interior.

In Popular Culture
1974 – In Chinatown J.J. Gittes says that Noah Cross last met Hollis I. Mulwray in front of the Pig 'n Whistle.
2001 - Visiting... with Huell Howser Episode 909
2019 - The Pig 'n Whistle was featured in the song "Colorado Bound" by Big SMO

References

External links

Drinking establishments in California
Defunct drinking establishments in the United States
Restaurants established in 1927
Restaurants disestablished in 2021
1927 establishments in California
2021 disestablishments in California
Defunct restaurants in Hollywood, Los Angeles